Edmund Sharpe (1809–1877) was an English architect, architectural historian, railway engineer, and sanitary reformer. Between 1832 and 1835, in receipt of a travelling fellowship, he studied architecture in Germany and southern France.  He started his career as an architect in Lancashire in 1835, initially on his own, then from 1845 in partnership with Edward Paley. He mainly designed churches but also some secular buildings, including domestic properties and schools. Sharpe pioneered the use of terracotta as a structural material in church construction, designing what were known as "pot" churches. During this time he also worked on the development of railways in Northwest England, including the design of bridges and the planning of new lines. In 1851, he resigned from his architectural practice, and in 1856 he moved from Lancaster and spent the rest of his career mainly as a railway engineer, first in North Wales, then in Switzerland and southern France. He returned to England in 1866 to live in Scotforth near Lancaster, where he designed a final church near to his home.

Sharpe achieved national recognition as an architectural historian. He devised a new scheme for classifying the styles of English Gothic architecture, published books of detailed architectural drawings, and towards the end of his career organized expeditions to study and draw buildings in England and France. In 1875, he was awarded the Royal Gold Medal of the Royal Institute of British Architects.  He wrote a number of articles on architecture, and was very critical of much of the restoration of medieval churches that had become a major occupation of contemporary architects.

This list contains the architectural works designed by Sharpe before Paley joined him as a partner, plus his last church.

Key

Works

See also
Sharpe, Paley and Austin
List of works by Sharpe and Paley

References
Citations

Sources

  (Although this is self-published, it is a scholarly  work and fully referenced throughout. As of 2011 it is available only as a CD.)

Lists of buildings and structures by architect